The Canon  EOS 5D is a 12.8 megapixel digital single-lens reflex (DSLR) camera body produced by Canon. The EOS 5D was announced by Canon on 22 August 2005, and at the time was priced above the EOS 20D but below the EOS-1D Mark II and EOS-1Ds Mark II in Canon's EOS digital SLR series. The camera accepts EF lens mount lenses.

The EOS 5D is notable for being the first full-frame DSLR camera with a standard body size (as opposed to the taller, double-grip "professional" camera body style). It is also notable for its price, suggested at US$3299 without lens, which set a significant new low price point for full-frame DSLRs; its only full-frame competition at the time was the Canon 1Ds Mark II, which cost more than twice as much.

On 17 September 2008, Canon announced the camera's successor, the Canon EOS 5D Mark II.

Features

Sensor and image processing
The 5D has a DIGIC II processor and a 35.8 x 23.9 mm full-frame CMOS sensor with 13.3 million pixels (12.7 megapixel effective) and a pixel density of 1.5 megapixels per square centimetre. ISO speeds from 100 to 1600 are provided, adjustable in 1/3 steps (ISO can be expanded to L: 50 or H: 3200 with a menu function). The ISO 50 setting reduces dynamic range by a stop in the highlights.

Autofocus and metering
The 5D has nine autofocus points (plus six "invisible assist AF points" available only during continuous-focus tracking) arranged in a horizontal diamond pattern. The AF system was a minor upgrade to the one on the 20D. The camera uses TTL 35-zone SPC metering with four variations (evaluative, center-weighted, partial, spot) and exposure compensation of −2 EV to +2 EV in steps of 1/3 EV.E-TTL II flash metering is provided.

Shutter
The shutter is rated to 100,000 shots, and is capable of speeds up to 1/8000 sec, with a flash sync speed of 1/200 sec.

Ergonomics

The 5D is very similar in design to the 20D, and most of the controls are identical or nearly so. Differences include:
 A much larger and brighter pentaprism viewfinder with approx. 96% coverage. This arrangement, borrowed from the 1D range, omits the pop-up flash of the consumer range.
 A larger, 230,000 pixel, 2.5" (63 mm) colour TFT liquid-crystal monitor

Speed
The 5D can shoot up to 3 frames per second, with a buffer that can store up to 60 frames in large JPEG mode, and up to 17 frames in RAW.

Physical dimensions
 Size (LxHxW): 152 x 113 x 75 mm (6.0 x 4.4 x 2.9 in)
 Weight (body only w/battery): 895 g

File numbering
The 5D is the first prosumer Canon DSLR where 9,999 images are stored to one folder (which was exclusive to the EOS-1D series), unlike its predecessors where 100 images are stored.

Software
The package includes the following software:
 Digital Photo Professional
 ZoomBrowser EX / ImageBrowser
 PhotoStitch
 EOS Utility
 Picture Style Editor

The EOS 5D is compatible with Magic Lantern firmware (old versions only).

See also
Kodak DCS Pro SLR/c, an earlier Canon EF-compatible full-frame digital SLR

References

External links

 Canon EOS 5D Product Page (Japan)
 5D Product page (USA)

Cameras introduced in 2005
5D
Full-frame DSLR cameras